The American Association of Bioanalysts (AAB) is a professional association for clinical laboratory scientists, clinical laboratory supervisors, clinical laboratory directors, and clinical laboratory consultants. Its office is based in St. Louis, Missouri, U.S..

Profile
The organization was formed in 1956 when the Council of American Bioanalysts (CAB) merged with the National Association of Clinical Laboratories (NACL) The AAB serves as an umbrella organization for the American Board of Bioanalysis, AAB Board of Registry AAB Associate Member Section, College of Reproductive Biology Environmental Biology and Public Health Section and National Independent Laboratory Association.

Role as a national certifying agency
The American Board of Bioanalysis, is a national certifying agency in the United States of America, for clinical laboratory directors and supervisors. The AAB Board of Registry is a national certifying agency in the United States of America for medical technologist and medical laboratory technicians. Those certified either meet or exceed the minimum requirements for testing personnel under Clinical Laboratory Improvement Amendments.

Role as a trade association
The National Independent Laboratory Association (NILA) functions as a trade association for community, regional, and health systems clinical laboratories. NILA has a long history of defending the clinical laboratory industry  from legislation that would be detrimental and costly to both the clinical laboratory and patients in the United States. One of their first victories prevented the reinstatement of the 20% copayment on Part B Clinical Laboratory Fee Schedule (CLFS) payments. The organization is currently playing a role in preventing PAMA's proposed fee cuts

State Licensure
The AAB officially supports state licensure for clinical laboratory personnel, but opposes laws it considers excessively restrictive. In 2014, the AAB clarified its licensure position in a response to Minnesota's H.F. 203 bill. AAB opposed the bill on the basis that it would  create  a hardship for United States trained military personnel to obtain a license, lead to creating loopholes where new standards would apply to only some of Minnesota's laboratories, and encouragedifferent wages based on education instead of work performed. The bill was successfully defeated allowing United States trained military personnel to continue working without additional education and training requirements.

References

External links
American Association of Bioanalysts
AAB Associate Member Section
American Board of Bioanalysis
College of Reproductive Biology
Environmental Biology and Public Health Section
National Independent Laboratory Association

Health care-related professional associations based in the United States
Scientific organizations established in 1956
1956 establishments in the United States
Organizations based in St. Louis